The Dutch Tweede Divisie in the 1962–63 season was contested by 34 teams. Due to a large number of teams entering from the higher Eerste Divisie after mass relegations there, there were 22 new entrants.

Teams were divided in two groups of seventeen teams. The champions played a play-off for promotion. After that match, a mini-tournament was held to determine a second team that would be promoted. It turned out that group B runners-up BVV would be promoted and not group B champions Haarlem.

New entrants
There were only twelve teams that had been participating in this league last season, meaning there were 22 new entrants. Many of the new entrants were teams that were promoted in the previous seasons of the Tweede Divisie. Due to the reorganisation in professional football by the KNVB, many teams were back to where they started.

Relegated from the Eerste Divsisie into group A
AGOVV Apeldoorn
Vitesse Arnhem
KFC
Alkmaar '54
Leeuwarden
Stormvogels
ZFC
Be Quick 1887
FC Wageningen
sc Heerenveen
VSV

Relegated from the Eerste Divsisie into group B
SVV
DFC
HVV 't Gooi
BVV
HFC Haarlem
Hermes DVS
TSV NOAD
FC Hilversum
HVC
RKVV Wilhelmina
Entered from amateur football
Xerxes (entered in group B)

Final tables

Group A

Group B

Play-offs
Several play-offs were held to determine the league champions, who would be promoted to the Eerste Divisie, and who would leave the Professional leagues altogether.

Championship play-off

VSV were promoted to the Eerste Divisie (playing as Telstar), while HFC Haarlem entered the Promotion Tournament.

Best 3rd-place play-off

HVC entered the promotion tournament, while NEC remained in the Tweede Divisie (and moved to Tweede B for next season).

Promotion tournament
To determine the second team to be promoted. Entering teams:
 the two 2nd-placed from the "regular season",
 the loser of the Championship play-off,
 and the winner of the Best 3rd-place play-off.

Play-off

BVV were promoted to the Eerste Divisie, HVC and HFC Haarlem moved to the Tweede Group A next season, and AGOVV Apeldoorn moved to the Tweede Group B.

Relegation play-off

However, as no amateur team wanted to enter professional football and VV Oldenzaal decided to return to amateur football on a voluntary basis, PEC weren't relegated.

See also
 1962–63 Eredivisie
 1962–63 Eerste Divisie

References
Netherlands - List of final tables (RSSSF)

Tweede Divisie seasons
3
Neth